Mark Roscoe Ashurst-McGee (born 1968) is an American historian of the Latter Day Saint movement and editor for the Joseph Smith Papers project.

Background
From 1988 to 1990, Ashurst-McGee served a mission for the Church of Jesus Christ of Latter-day Saints (LDS Church) in New Jersey.  His wife Angela was a fellow of Western American Literature (an academic journal), a teacher of college English, a freelance editor for the Joseph Smith Papers, and currently runs the résumé writing service Red Rocket Résumé. They have five children.

Ashurst-McGee received a B.A. and B.S. from Brigham Young University (BYU) in 1994, and an M.A. in History from Utah State University (USU) in 2000.  During his graduate studies he also did a summer seminar course in Latter-day Saint history at BYU that was led by Richard L. Bushman. His master's thesis on Joseph Smith's religious development won the Reese History Award from the Mormon History Association.  He then pursued his doctorate in history at Arizona State University (ASU), where he also worked on a project for American Indian history and culture.  His dissertation was on Joseph Smith's early social and political thought, and won the Gerald E. Jones Dissertation Award from the Mormon History Association.  Through this training, he became a "specialist in documentary editing conventions and transcription methodology."  A BYU professor of religious education and colleague in the Joseph Smith Papers Project, Steven C. Harper, stated Ashurst-McGee "probably knows the field of documentary editing better than anybody that I know."

Mormon studies
In 1999, Ashurst-McGee was an intern in the Church Archives of the LDS Church.  After his time at ASU, he joined the staff of the Joseph Fielding Smith Institute for Latter-day Saint History at Brigham Young University.  He also worked as an editor for Deseret Book and published articles with the Foundation for Ancient Research and Mormon Studies (FARMS) and the Mormon History Association.

When FARMS printed a coordinated critique of Grant H. Palmer's controversial 2002 book, An Insider's View of Mormon Origins, Ashurst-McGee wrote one of the five critiques published in the FARMS Review.  The other reviewers were James B. Allen, Davis Bitton, Louis Midgley, and Steven C. Harper.

Ashurst-McGee is a member of the Joseph Smith Papers Project. Along with Richard L. Jensen and Dean C. Jessee, he co-edited the first volume to be published from the series, which was on the early journals of Joseph Smith. Released in 2008, the book became very popular and sold very quickly, prompting expanded additional printings. In 2009, it received the Steven F. Christensen Best Documentary Award (Mormon History Association) and a Special Award in Textual Criticism and Bibliography (Association for Mormon Letters).  Ashurst-McGee is expected to edit future volumes of Smith's papers.

Work

.

Notes

Sources
 Biography at Joseph Smith Papers Project website (accessed May 4, 2012)
Maxwell Institute listing
University of Utah papers listing

External links
 

1969 births
20th-century Mormon missionaries
American Mormon missionaries in the United States
Arizona State University alumni
Brigham Young University alumni
Brigham Young University staff
Historians of the Latter Day Saint movement
Living people
Utah State University alumni
Latter Day Saints from Utah
Latter Day Saints from Arizona